Sayre Area High School is a rural combined junior–senior high school in Sayre, Pennsylvania, that serves two noncontiguous areas of Bradford County: Litchfield Township and the boroughs of Sayre and South Waverly. It is the sole junior and senior high school operated by the Sayre Area School District.

In the 2018–2019 school year, the school had 489 students in grades 7–12 .

Sayre Area High School students may choose to attend the Northern Tier Career Center for training in several areas: construction and mechanical trades (including auto mechanics), practical nursing, commercial driving, cosmetology, and food production management. The BLaST Intermediate Unit 17 provides the school with a wide variety of services, including specialized education for disabled students, speech and visual disability services, state-mandated training on recognizing and reporting child abuse, criminal background check processing for prospective employees, and professional development for staff and faculty.

Extracurricular activities
The district offers a variety of clubs and activities, as well as an extensive, publicly funded sports program.

Sports
The school provides:

Boys
Baseball - A
Basketball - AA
Cross-country - A
Football - AA
Golf - AA
Soccer - A
Swimming and diving - AA
Track and field - AA
Wrestling	- AA

Girls
Basketball - AA
Cheer - AAAA
Cross-country - AA
Soccer (fall) - A
Softball - A
Swimming and diving - AA
Track and field - AA
Volleyball - A

Junior high school sports

Boys
Basketball
Cross-country
Football
Soccer
Track and field
Wrestling	

Girls
Basketball
Cheer
Cross-country
Track and field
Volleyball

References

Public high schools in Pennsylvania
Schools in Bradford County, Pennsylvania